Beaver Dam is an unincorporated community in Franklin Township, Kosciusko County, in the U.S. state of Indiana.

History
Beaver Dam (previously spelled Beaverdam) contained a post office from 1844 until 1901. A beaver dam on the nearby creek caused the name to be selected.

Geography

References

Unincorporated communities in Kosciusko County, Indiana
Unincorporated communities in Indiana